Saint Nilus may refer to:

Nilus of Palestine (3rd century)
Nilus of Sinai (Nilus the Elder) (d. c. 430)
Nilus the Younger (Nilus of Rossano) (910 – 1005)
Nilus of Sora (c. 1433 – 1508)
Nilus the Myrrh-streamer (Nilus the Myrrh-gusher) (1601 – 1651)
Nilus of Stolbnyi Island (16th century) 
St. Nilus Island Skete
Agios Nilos, Mount Athos, a monastic settlement named after Nilus the Myrrh-streamer